Danilo Larangeira (born 10 May 1984), known simply as Danilo, is a Brazilian professional footballer who plays as centre-back.

Career

Palmeiras 
On 16 December 2009, Palmeiras have made official the signing from Atlético Paranaense of the central defender, first market trade of Verdão for the 2010 season, the footballer arrived on loan at the beginning of 2009. Verdão partnered with Traffic Group to sign him and Atlético Paranaense retained 20% rights.

Bologna 
On August 16, 2018, Danilo joined to Bologna on loan with a purchase obligatory.

Controversy 
In April 2010 he gained national attention when he was accused of racism by Atlético Paranaense's defender Manoel. During a match between Atlético and Palmeiras on 15 April, TV cameras captured a scene in which Danilo called Manoel "macaco" (monkey in Portuguese language). Danilo later publicly admitted that he offended and spat at Manoel, who reported the incident to a police station in São Paulo just after the match.

In January 2013, the São Paulo Criminal Court sentenced him to one year in prison, although he was expected to have the punishment reduced to a fine on appeal.

Career statistics

Honours
Ituano
Brazilian League C: 2003

Atlético Paranaense
Paraná State League: 2005

References

External links
 
 globoesporte.com 
 
 rubronegro.net
 Tafffic

1984 births
Living people
People from São Bernardo do Campo
Association football central defenders
Brazilian footballers
Club Athletico Paranaense players
Paulista Futebol Clube players
Ituano FC players
Desportivo Brasil players
Sociedade Esportiva Palmeiras players
Udinese Calcio players
Bologna F.C. 1909 players
Parma Calcio 1913 players
Campeonato Brasileiro Série A players
Campeonato Brasileiro Série B players
Campeonato Brasileiro Série C players
Serie A players
Serie B players
Brazilian expatriate footballers
Brazilian expatriate sportspeople in Italy
Expatriate footballers in Italy
Footballers from São Paulo (state)